Paul Palmer (died 1747) was the founder of several Baptist churches that became affiliated with the General Baptists. Palmer started several early Baptist churches in North Carolina, including the first known Baptist church in the state. He was an Arminian baptist and founder of the movement Free Will Baptist with Benjamin Randall.  His home church was Delaware's Welsh Tract Baptist Church, which was Calvinist.

Life
Palmer's wife Joanna was the stepdaughter of Benjamin Laker, who emigrated to the Carolinas in the 1680s from England where he had been an associate of English General Baptist theologian Thomas Grantham, a signer of the 1663 General Baptists' Standard Confession of Faith. Grantham was the chief apologist and theologian of the General Baptists in the later seventeenth century. He was both anti-predestinarian and orthodox all his days. According to Elder John T. Albritton:

[Palmer] was said to have been a native of Maryland, was baptized in Delaware, and ordained in Connecticut. He was some time in New Jersey, and removed thence to Maryland, and thence to Perquimans County, N. C. He belonged to the General Baptists, and was actively engaged in the work of the ministry for many years in this State, traveling over a large portion of Eastern Carolina, winning converts wherever he went.

While in Maryland, Palmer served the First Baptist Church in Baltimore County. Around 1727, Palmer founded North Carolina's first Baptist church at Shiloh, North Carolina, (then called Perquimans) in Camden County. Palmer and his wife Joanna were indicted by the colonial courts in North Carolina for their ministry.   It is generally accepted that Palmer died in 1747.

References

1747 deaths
18th-century Baptist ministers from the United States
Arminian ministers
Free Will Baptists
Year of birth unknown